Sansicario (also spelled San Sicario) is a frazione of the comune of Cesana Torinese (Metropolitan City of Turin) in Piedmont, north-western Italy.

It lies at 1,700 m in the Val Susa and has a population of 93 people. It is a famous winter tourist resort.

At the 2006 Torino Winter Olympics, it hosted the biathlon, luge, skeleton, bobsled, and also the Women's' Downhill and Super-G Alpine skiing races.

References 

Venues of the 2006 Winter Olympics
Cities and towns in Piedmont